ASZ or Asz may refer to:

 Acronis Secure Zone, hard disk drive partition type
 Aktion Sühnezeichen (Action for Reconciliation), East German peace organization after World War II
 Also sprach Zarathustra (Thus Spoke Zarathustra), 1883 German philosophical novel by Friedrich Nietzsche
 Szalom Asz (1880–1957), Polish-American writer
 Ász, cigar brand
 -asz, Polish conjugation
 As language, ISO-639-3 code for the Raja Ampat language

See also
 
 
 AS (disambiguation)
 SZ (disambiguation)